This is a list of the mammal species recorded in Nigeria. Of the mammal species in Nigeria, one is critically endangered, thirteen are endangered, sixteen are vulnerable, and ten are near threatened. One of the species listed for Nigeria can no longer be found in the wild.

The following tags are used to highlight each species' conservation status as assessed by the International Union for Conservation of Nature:

Some species were assessed using an earlier set of criteria. Species assessed using this system have the following instead of near threatened and least concern categories:

Order: Afrosoricida (tenrecs and golden moles) 

The order Afrosoricida contains the golden moles of southern Africa and the tenrecs of Madagascar and Africa, two families of small mammals that were traditionally part of the order Insectivora.

Family: Tenrecidae (tenrecs)
Subfamily: Potamogalinae
Genus: Potamogale
 Giant otter shrew, P. velox

Order: Tubulidentata (aardvarks) 

The order Tubulidentata consists of a single species, the aardvark. Tubulidentata are characterised by their teeth which lack a pulp cavity and form thin tubes which are continuously worn down and replaced.
Family: Orycteropodidae
Genus: Orycteropus
Aardvark, O. afer

Order: Hyracoidea (hyraxes) 

The hyraxes are any of four species of fairly small, thickset, herbivorous mammals in the order Hyracoidea. About the size of a domestic cat they are well-furred, with rounded bodies and a stumpy tail. They are native to Africa and the Middle East.
Family: Procaviidae
Genus: Dendrohyrax
 Western tree hyrax, D. dorsalis 
Genus: Procavia
Cape hyrax, P. capensis

Order: Proboscidea (elephants) 

The elephants comprise three living species and are the largest living land animals.
Family: Elephantidae (elephants)
Genus: Loxodonta
African bush elephant, L. africana 
African forest elephant, L. cyclotis

Order: Sirenia (manatees and dugongs) 

Sirenia is an order of fully aquatic, herbivorous mammals that inhabit rivers, estuaries, coastal marine waters, swamps, and marine wetlands. All four species are endangered.

Family: Trichechidae
Genus: Trichechus
 African manatee, T. senegalensis

Order: Primates 

The order Primates contains humans and their closest relatives: lemurs, lorisoids, tarsiers, monkeys, and apes.

Suborder: Strepsirrhini
Infraorder: Lemuriformes
Superfamily: Lorisoidea
Family: Lorisidae
Genus: Arctocebus
 Calabar angwantibo, Arctocebus calabarensis LR/nt
Genus: Perodicticus
 West-African potto, Perodicticus (potto) potto LR/lc
 Milne-Edward's potto, Perodictus (potto) edwardsi LR/lc
Family: Galagidae
Genus: Sciurocheirus
 Bioko Allen's bushbaby, Sciurocheirus alleni LR/nt
Genus: Galagoides
 Prince Demidoff's bushbaby, Galagoides demidovii LR/lc
 Thomas's bushbaby, Galagoides thomasi LR/lc
Genus: Galago
 Senegal bushbaby, Galago senegalensis LR/lc
Genus: Euoticus
 Northern needle-clawed bushbaby, Euoticus pallidus LR/nt
Suborder: Haplorhini
Infraorder: Simiiformes
Parvorder: Catarrhini
Superfamily: Cercopithecoidea
Family: Cercopithecidae (Old World monkeys)
Genus: Erythrocebus
 Patas monkey, Erythrocebus patas LR/nt
Genus: Chlorocebus
 Tantalus monkey, Chlorocebus tantalus LR/lc
Genus: Cercopithecus
 White-throated guenon, Cercopithecus erythrogaster EN
 Red-eared guenon, Cercopithecus erythrotis VU
 Mona monkey, Cercopithecus mona LR/nt
 Greater spot-nosed monkey, Cercopithecus nictitans LR/nt
 Crowned guenon, Cercopithecus pogonias LR/lc
 Preuss's monkey, Cercopithecus preussi EN
 Putty-nosed monkey, Cercopithecus nictitans LR/nt
 Sclater's guenon, Cercopithecus sclateri EN
Genus: Lophocebus
 Grey-cheeked mangabey, Lophocebus albigena VU
Genus: Papio
 Olive baboon, Papio anubis LR/lc
Genus: Cercocebus
 Collared mangabey, Cercocebus torquatus EN
Genus: Mandrillus
 Drill, Mandrillus leucophaeus EN
Subfamily: Colobinae
Genus: Colobus
 Mantled guereza, Colobus guereza LR/lc
 Ursine colobus, Colobus vellerosus CR
Genus: Procolobus
 Olive colobus, Procolobus verus VU
Genus: Piliocolobus
 Niger Delta red colobus, Piliocolobus epieni CR
 Preuss's red colobus, Piliocolobus preussi CR
Superfamily: Hominoidea
Family: Hominidae
Subfamily: Homininae
Tribe: Gorillini
Genus: Gorilla
 Western gorilla, Gorilla gorilla CR
Tribe: Panini
Genus: Pan
 Common chimpanzee, Pan troglodytes EN

Order: Rodentia (rodents) 

Rodents make up the largest order of mammals, with over 40% of mammalian species. They have two incisors in the upper and lower jaw which grow continually and must be kept short by gnawing.

Suborder: Hystricognathi
Family: Bathyergidae
Genus: Cryptomys
 Nigerian mole-rat, Cryptomys foxi DD
Family: Hystricidae (Old World porcupines)
Genus: Hystrix
 Crested porcupine, Hystrix cristata LC
Family: Thryonomyidae (cane rats)
Genus: Thryonomys
 Greater cane rat, Thryonomys swinderianus LC
Suborder: Sciurognathi
Family: Anomaluridae
Subfamily: Anomalurinae
Genus: Anomalurus
 Lord Derby's scaly-tailed squirrel, Anomalurus derbianus LC
Genus: Anomalurops
 Beecroft's scaly-tailed squirrel, Anomalurops beecrofti LC
Family: Sciuridae (squirrels)
Subfamily: Xerinae
Tribe: Xerini
Genus: Xerus
 Striped ground squirrel, Xerus erythropus LC
Tribe: Protoxerini
Genus: Funisciurus
 Thomas's rope squirrel, Funisciurus anerythrus DD
 Red-cheeked rope squirrel, Funisciurus leucogenys DD
 Fire-footed rope squirrel, Funisciurus pyrropus LC
Genus: Heliosciurus
 Gambian sun squirrel, Heliosciurus gambianus LC
 Red-legged sun squirrel, Heliosciurus rufobrachium LC
Genus: Paraxerus
 Cooper's mountain squirrel, Paraxerus cooperi DD
 Green bush squirrel, Paraxerus poensis LC
Genus: Protoxerus
 Forest giant squirrel, Protoxerus stangeri LC
Family: Gliridae (dormice)
Subfamily: Graphiurinae
Genus: Graphiurus
 Jentink's dormouse, Graphiurus crassicaudatus DD
 Lorrain dormouse, Graphiurus lorraineus LC
 Nagtglas's African dormouse, Graphiurus nagtglasii LC
 Kellen's dormouse, Graphiurus kelleni DD
Family: Dipodidae (jerboas)
Subfamily: Dipodinae
Genus: Jaculus
 Lesser Egyptian jerboa, Jaculus jaculus LC
Family: Nesomyidae
Subfamily: Dendromurinae
Genus: Dendromus
 Gray climbing mouse, Dendromus melanotis LC
 Banana climbing mouse, Dendromus messorius LC
Genus: Steatomys
 Northwestern fat mouse, Steatomys caurinus LC
 Dainty fat mouse, Steatomys cuppedius LC
 Jackson's fat mouse, Steatomys jacksoni VU
Subfamily: Cricetomyinae
Genus: Cricetomys
 Emin's pouched rat, Cricetomys emini LC
 Gambian pouched rat, Cricetomys gambianus LC
Family: Muridae (mice, rats, voles, gerbils, hamsters, etc.)
Subfamily: Deomyinae
Genus: Acomys
 Johan's spiny mouse, Acomys johannis LC
Genus: Lophuromys
 Rusty-bellied brush-furred rat, Lophuromys sikapusi LC
Genus: Uranomys
 Rudd's mouse, Uranomys ruddi LC
Subfamily: Otomyinae
Genus: Otomys
 Western vlei rat, Otomys occidentalis VU
Subfamily: Gerbillinae
Genus: Desmodilliscus
 Pouched gerbil, Desmodilliscus braueri LC
Genus: Gerbillus
 Sudan gerbil, Gerbillus nancillus DD
 Nigerian gerbil, Gerbillus nigeriae LC
Genus: Tatera
 Kemp's gerbil, Tatera kempi LC
 Fringe-tailed gerbil, Tatera robusta LC
Genus: Taterillus
 Gracile tateril, Taterillus gracilis LC
 Lake Chad gerbil, Taterillus lacustris LC
Subfamily: Murinae
Genus: Aethomys
 Tinfields rock rat, Aethomys stannarius NT
Genus: Arvicanthis
 African grass rat, Arvicanthis niloticus LC
Genus: Dasymys
 Fox's shaggy rat, Dasymys foxi VU
 West African shaggy rat, Dasymys rufulus LC
Genus: Grammomys
 Shining thicket rat, Grammomys rutilans LC
Genus: Hybomys
 Temminck's striped mouse, Hybomys trivirgatus LC
 Peters's striped mouse, Hybomys univittatus LC
Genus: Hylomyscus
 Allen's wood mouse, Hylomyscus alleni LC
 Stella wood mouse, Hylomyscus stella LC
Genus: Lemniscomys
 Typical striped grass mouse, Lemniscomys striatus LC
 Heuglin's striped grass mouse, Lemniscomys zebra LC
Genus: Malacomys
 Edward's swamp rat, Malacomys edwardsi LC
 Big-eared swamp rat, Malacomys longipes LC
Genus: Mastomys
 Guinea multimammate mouse, Mastomys erythroleucus LC
 Hubert's multimammate mouse, Mastomys huberti LC
 Verheyen's multimammate mouse, Mastomys kollmannspergeri LC
 Natal multimammate mouse, Mastomys natalensis LC
Genus: Mus
 Hausa mouse, Mus haussa LC
 African pygmy mouse, Mus minutoides LC
 Peters's mouse, Mus setulosus LC
Genus: Oenomys
 Common rufous-nosed rat, Oenomys hypoxanthus LC
Genus: Praomys
 Dalton's mouse, Praomys daltoni LC
 Deroo's mouse, Praomys derooi LC
 Jackson's soft-furred mouse, Praomys jacksoni LC
 Gotel Mountain soft-furred mouse, Praomys obscurus EN
 Tullberg's soft-furred mouse, Praomys tullbergi LC
Genus: Stochomys
 Target rat, Stochomys longicaudatus LC

Order: Lagomorpha (lagomorphs) 

The lagomorphs comprise two families, Leporidae (hares and rabbits), and Ochotonidae (pikas). Though they can resemble rodents, and were classified as a superfamily in that order until the early 20th century, they have since been considered a separate order. They differ from rodents in a number of physical characteristics, such as having four incisors in the upper jaw rather than two.
Family: Leporidae (rabbits, hares)
Genus: Lepus
African savanna hare, L. victoriae

Order: Erinaceomorpha (hedgehogs and gymnures) 

The order Erinaceomorpha contains a single family, Erinaceidae, which comprise the hedgehogs and gymnures. The hedgehogs are easily recognised by their spines while gymnures look more like large rats.

Family: Erinaceidae (hedgehogs)
Subfamily: Erinaceinae
Genus: Atelerix
 Four-toed hedgehog, Atelerix albiventris LR/lc

Order: Soricomorpha (shrews, moles, and solenodons) 

The "shrew-forms" are insectivorous mammals. The shrews and solenodons closely resemble mice while the moles are stout-bodied burrowers.

Family: Soricidae (shrews)
Subfamily: Crocidurinae
Genus: Crocidura
 Hun shrew, Crocidura attila LC
 Buettikofer's shrew, Crocidura buettikoferi LC
 Crosse's shrew, Crocidura crossei LC
 Dent's shrew, Crocidura denti LC
 Long-tailed musk shrew, Crocidura dolichura LC
 Doucet's musk shrew, Crocidura douceti DD
 Fox's shrew, Crocidura foxi LC
 Savanna shrew, Crocidura fulvastra LC
 Bicolored musk shrew, Crocidura fuscomurina LC
 Large-headed shrew, Crocidura grandiceps NT
 Lamotte's shrew, Crocidura lamottei LC
 Savanna swamp shrew, Crocidura longipes DD
 Mauritanian shrew, Crocidura lusitania LC
 Nigerian shrew, Crocidura nigeriae LC
 West African pygmy shrew, Crocidura obscurior LC
 African giant shrew, Crocidura olivieri LC
 Small-footed shrew, Crocidura parvipes LC
 Flat-headed shrew, Crocidura planiceps DD
 Fraser's musk shrew, Crocidura poensis LC
 Savanna path shrew, Crocidura viaria LC
 Voi shrew, Crocidura voi LC
 Yankari shrew, Crocidura yankariensis LC
Genus: Suncus
 Etruscan shrew, Suncus etruscus LC
 Least dwarf shrew, Suncus infinitesimus LC
Genus: Sylvisorex
 Cameroonian forest shrew, Sylvisorex camerunensis EN
 Climbing shrew, Sylvisorex megalura LC
 Greater forest shrew, Sylvisorex ollula LC

Order: Chiroptera (bats) 

The bats' most distinguishing feature is that their forelimbs are developed as wings, making them the only mammals capable of flight. Bat species account for about 20% of all mammals.

Family: Pteropodidae (flying foxes, Old World fruit bats)
Subfamily: Pteropodinae
Genus: Eidolon
 Straw-coloured fruit bat, Eidolon helvum LC
Genus: Epomophorus
 Gambian epauletted fruit bat, Epomophorus gambianus LC
 Ethiopian epauletted fruit bat, Epomophorus labiatus LC
Genus: Epomops
 Buettikofer's epauletted fruit bat, Epomops buettikoferi LC
 Franquet's epauletted fruit bat, Epomops franqueti LC
Genus: Hypsignathus
 Hammer-headed bat, Hypsignathus monstrosus LC
Genus: Lissonycteris
 Angolan rousette, Lissonycteris angolensis LC
 Smith's fruit bat, Lissonycteris smithi LC
Genus: Micropteropus
 Peters's dwarf epauletted fruit bat, Micropteropus pusillus LC
Genus: Myonycteris
 Little collared fruit bat, Myonycteris torquata LC
Genus: Nanonycteris
 Veldkamp's dwarf epauletted fruit bat, Nanonycteris veldkampi LC
Genus: Rousettus
 Egyptian fruit bat, Rousettus aegyptiacus LC
Genus: Scotonycteris
 Zenker's fruit bat, Scotonycteris zenkeri NT
Subfamily: Macroglossinae
Genus: Megaloglossus
 Woermann's bat, Megaloglossus woermanni LC
Family: Vespertilionidae
Subfamily: Kerivoulinae
Genus: Kerivoula
 Lesser woolly bat, Kerivoula lanosa LC
 Smith's woolly bat, Kerivoula smithi LC
Subfamily: Myotinae
Genus: Myotis
 Rufous mouse-eared bat, Myotis bocagii LC
 Morris's bat, Myotis morrisi VU
Subfamily: Vespertilioninae
Genus: Eptesicus
 Lagos serotine, Eptesicus platyops DD
Genus: Glauconycteris
 Beatrix's bat, Glauconycteris beatrix NT
 Abo bat, Glauconycteris poensis LC
 Butterfly bat, Glauconycteris variegata LC
Genus: Mimetillus
 Moloney's mimic bat, Mimetillus moloneyi LC
Genus: Neoromicia
 Dark-brown serotine, Neoromicia brunneus NT
 Cape serotine, Neoromicia capensis LC
 Tiny serotine, Neoromicia guineensis LC
 Banana pipistrelle, Neoromicia nanus LC
 Rendall's serotine, Neoromicia rendalli LC
 Somali serotine, Neoromicia somalicus LC
 White-winged serotine, Neoromicia tenuipinnis LC
Genus: Nycticeinops
 Schlieffen's bat, Nycticeinops schlieffeni LC
Genus: Pipistrellus
 Egyptian pipistrelle, Pipistrellus deserti LC
 Aellen's pipistrelle, Pipistrellus inexspectatus DD
 Tiny pipistrelle, Pipistrellus nanulus LC
 Rüppell's pipistrelle, Pipistrellus rueppelli LC
 Rusty pipistrelle, Pipistrellus rusticus LC
Genus: Scotoecus
 Light-winged lesser house bat, Scotoecus albofuscus DD
 Hinde's lesser house bat, Scotoecus hindei DD
 Dark-winged lesser house bat, Scotoecus hirundo DD
Genus: Scotophilus
 African yellow bat, Scotophilus dinganii LC
 White-bellied yellow bat, Scotophilus leucogaster LC
 Schreber's yellow bat, Scotophilus nigrita NT
 Nut-colored yellow bat, Scotophilus nux LC
 Greenish yellow bat, Scotophilus viridis LC
Subfamily: Miniopterinae
Genus: Miniopterus
Common bent-wing bat, M. schreibersii 
Family: Rhinopomatidae
Genus: Rhinopoma
 Egyptian mouse-tailed bat, R. cystops 
 Lesser mouse-tailed bat, Rhinopoma hardwickei LC
 Greater mouse-tailed bat, Rhinopoma microphyllum LC
Family: Molossidae
Genus: Chaerephon
 Ansorge's free-tailed bat, Chaerephon ansorgei LC
 Gland-tailed free-tailed bat, Chaerephon bemmeleni LC
 Lappet-eared free-tailed bat, Chaerephon major LC
 Nigerian free-tailed bat, Chaerephon nigeriae LC
 Little free-tailed bat, Chaerephon pumila LC
Genus: Mops
 Sierra Leone free-tailed bat, Mops brachypterus LC
 Angolan free-tailed bat, Mops condylurus LC
 Midas free-tailed bat, Mops midas LC
 Dwarf free-tailed bat, Mops nanulus LC
 Railer bat, Mops thersites LC
 Trevor's free-tailed bat, Mops trevori VU
Genus: Myopterus
 Bini free-tailed bat, Myopterus whitleyi LC
Genus: Tadarida
 Egyptian free-tailed bat, Tadarida aegyptiaca LC
Family: Emballonuridae
Genus: Coleura
 African sheath-tailed bat, Coleura afra LC
Genus: Saccolaimus
 Pel's pouched bat, Saccolaimus peli NT
Genus: Taphozous
 Mauritian tomb bat, Taphozous mauritianus LC
 Naked-rumped tomb bat, Taphozous nudiventris LC
 Egyptian tomb bat, Taphozous perforatus LC
Family: Nycteridae
Genus: Nycteris
 Bate's slit-faced bat, Nycteris arge LC
 Gambian slit-faced bat, Nycteris gambiensis LC
 Large slit-faced bat, Nycteris grandis LC
 Hairy slit-faced bat, Nycteris hispida LC
 Large-eared slit-faced bat, Nycteris macrotis LC
 Egyptian slit-faced bat, Nycteris thebaica LC
Family: Megadermatidae
Genus: Lavia
 Yellow-winged bat, Lavia frons LC
Family: Rhinolophidae
Subfamily: Rhinolophinae
Genus: Rhinolophus
 Halcyon horseshoe bat, Rhinolophus alcyone LC
 Darling's horseshoe bat, Rhinolophus darlingi LC
 Rüppell's horseshoe bat, Rhinolophus fumigatus LC
 Hildebrandt's horseshoe bat, Rhinolophus hildebrandti LC
 Hill's horseshoe bat, Rhinolophus hillorum VU
 Lander's horseshoe bat, Rhinolophus landeri LC
 Bushveld horseshoe bat, Rhinolophus simulator LC
Subfamily: Hipposiderinae
Genus: Hipposideros
 Aba roundleaf bat, Hipposideros abae NT
 Benito roundleaf bat, Hipposideros beatus LC
 Sundevall's roundleaf bat, Hipposideros caffer LC
 Cyclops roundleaf bat, Hipposideros cyclops LC
 Sooty roundleaf bat, Hipposideros fuliginosus NT
 Giant roundleaf bat, Hipposideros gigas LC
 Jones's roundleaf bat, Hipposideros jonesi NT
 Noack's roundleaf bat, Hipposideros ruber LC

Order: Pholidota (pangolins) 

The order Pholidota comprises the eight species of pangolin. Pangolins are anteaters (not to be confused with the taxonomical anteaters) and have the powerful claws, elongated snout and long tongue seen in the other unrelated anteater species.
Family: Manidae
Genus: Phataginus
Long-tailed pangolin, P. tetradactyla 
Tree pangolin, P. tricuspis 
Genus Smutsia
Giant pangolin, M. gigantea

Order: Cetacea (whales) 

The order Cetacea includes whales, dolphins and porpoises. They are the mammals most fully adapted to aquatic life with a spindle-shaped nearly hairless body, protected by a thick layer of blubber, and forelimbs and tail modified to provide propulsion underwater.
Suborder: Mysticeti
Family: Balaenopteridae
Subfamily: Balaenopterinae
Genus: Balaenoptera
 Common minke whale, Balaenoptera acutorostrata LC
 Antarctic minke whale, Balaenoptera bonaerensis DD
 Sei whale, Balaenoptera borealis EN
 Bryde's whale, Balaenoptera edeni DD
 Blue whale, Balaenoptera musculus EN
 Fin whale, Balaenoptera physalus EN
Subfamily: Megapterinae
Genus: Megaptera
 Humpback whale, Megaptera novaeangliae VU
Suborder: Odontoceti
Superfamily: Platanistoidea
Family: Physeteridae
Genus: Physeter
 Sperm whale, Physeter macrocephalus VU
Family: Kogiidae
Genus: Kogia
Pygmy sperm whale, K. breviceps 
 Dwarf sperm whale, Kogia sima
Family: Ziphidae
Subfamily: Hyperoodontinae
Genus: Mesoplodon
 Blainville's beaked whale, Mesoplodon densirostris DD
 Gervais' beaked whale, Mesoplodon europaeus DD
Genus: Ziphius
 Cuvier's beaked whale, Ziphius cavirostris DD
Family: Delphinidae (marine dolphins)
Genus: Steno
 Rough-toothed dolphin, Steno bredanensis DD
Genus: Tursiops
 Common bottlenose dolphin, Tursiops truncatus LC
Genus: Delphinus
 Long-beaked common dolphin, Delphinus capensis DD
Genus: Stenella
 Pantropical spotted dolphin, Stenella attenuata LR/cd
 Striped dolphin, Stenella coeruleoalba LR/cd
 Atlantic spotted dolphin, Stenella frontalis DD
 Clymene dolphin, Stenella clymene DD
 Spinner dolphin, Stenella longirostris LR/cd
Genus: Lagenodelphis
 Fraser's dolphin, Lagenodelphis hosei DD
Genus: Sousa
 Atlantic humpback dolphin, Sousa teuszii
Genus: Orcinus
Orca, O. orca 
Genus: Feresa
 Pygmy killer whale, Feresa attenuata DD
Genus: Pseudorca
 False killer whale, Pseudorca crassidens LR/lc
Genus: Globicephala
 Short-finned pilot whale, Globicephala macrorhynchus LR/cd
Genus: Peponocephala
 Melon-headed whale, Peponocephala electra DD

Order: Carnivora (carnivorans) 

There are over 260 species of carnivorans, the majority of which feed primarily on meat. They have a characteristic skull shape and dentition.
Suborder: Feliformia
Family: Felidae (cats)
Subfamily: Felinae
Genus: Caracal
African golden cat, C. aurata 
Caracal, C. caracal 
Genus: Leptailurus
Serval, L. serval 
Subfamily: Pantherinae
Genus: Panthera
Lion, P. leo  
Leopard, P. pardus 
Family: Viverridae
Subfamily: Viverrinae
Genus: Civettictis
African civet, C. civetta 
Genus: Genetta
Crested servaline genet, G. cristata 
Common genet, G. genetta 
Rusty-spotted genet, G. maculata 
Hausa genet, G. thierryi 
Family: Nandiniidae
Genus: Nandinia
African palm civet, N. binotata 
Family: Herpestidae (mongooses)
Genus: Atilax
Marsh mongoose, A. paludinosus 
Genus: Bdeogale
Black-footed mongoose, B. nigripes 
Genus: Crossarchus
Flat-headed kusimanse, C. platycephalus LC
Genus: Herpestes
Egyptian mongoose, H. ichneumon 
Common slender mongoose, H. sanguineus 
Genus: Ichneumia
White-tailed mongoose, I. albicauda 
Genus: Mungos
Gambian mongoose, M. gambianus 
Banded mongoose, M. mungo 
Genus: Xenogale
Long-nosed mongoose, X. naso 
Family: Hyaenidae (hyaenas)
Genus: Crocuta
Spotted hyena, C. crocuta 
Genus: Hyaena
Striped hyena, H. hyaena 
Suborder: Caniformia
Family: Canidae (dogs, foxes)
Genus: Vulpes
Pale fox, V. pallida 
Genus: Canis
African golden wolf, C. lupaster 
Genus: Lupulella
 Side-striped jackal, L. adusta  
Genus: Lycaon
African wild dog, L. pictus  possibly extirpated
Family: Mustelidae (mustelids)
Genus: Ictonyx
Saharan striped polecat, I. libyca 
Striped polecat, I. striatus 
Genus: Mellivora
Honey badger, M. capensis 
Genus: Hydrictis
Speckle-throated otter, H. maculicollis 
Genus: Aonyx
African clawless otter, A. capensis  
Congo clawless otter, A. congicus  presence uncertain

Order: Artiodactyla (even-toed ungulates) 

The even-toed ungulates are ungulates whose weight is borne about equally by the third and fourth toes, rather than mostly or entirely by the third as in perissodactyls. There are about 220 artiodactyl species, including many that are of great economic importance to humans.
Family: Suidae (pigs)
Subfamily: Phacochoerinae
Genus: Phacochoerus
 Common warthog, Phacochoerus africanus
Subfamily: Suinae
Genus: Hylochoerus
 Giant forest hog, Hylochoerus meinertzhageni
Genus: Potamochoerus
 Red river hog, Potamochoerus porcus
Family: Hippopotamidae (hippopotamuses)
Genus: Choeropsis
 Pygmy hippopotamus, C. liberiensis  extirpated
Genus: Hippopotamus
Hippopotamus, H. amphibius  
Family: Tragulidae
Genus: Hyemoschus
 Water chevrotain, Hyemoschus aquaticus DD
Family: Giraffidae (giraffe, okapi)
Genus: Giraffa
 Giraffe, Giraffa camelopardalis VU extirpated
Family: Bovidae (cattle, antelope, sheep, goats)
Subfamily: Alcelaphinae
Genus: Alcelaphus
Hartebeest, A. buselaphus 
Genus: Damaliscus
 Korrigum, Damaliscus lunatus LR/cd
Subfamily: Antilopinae
Genus: Gazella
 Dorcas gazelle, Gazella dorcas VU possibly extirpated
 Red-fronted gazelle, Gazella rufifrons VU
Genus: Nanger
 Dama gazelle, Nanger dama CR extirpated, vagrant
Genus: Neotragus
 Bates's pygmy antelope, Neotragus batesi LR/nt
Genus: Oreotragus
 Klipspringer, Oreotragus oreotragus LR/cd
Genus: Ourebia
 Oribi, Ourebia ourebi LR/cd
Subfamily: Bovinae
Genus: Syncerus
African buffalo, S. caffer 
Genus: Tragelaphus
 Giant eland, Tragelaphus derbianus LR/nt
 Bushbuck, Tragelaphus scriptus LR/lc
 Sitatunga, Tragelaphus spekii LR/nt
Subfamily: Cephalophinae
Genus: Cephalophus
 Bay duiker, Cephalophus dorsalis LR/nt
 Maxwell's duiker, Cephalophus maxwellii LR/nt
 Blue duiker, Cephalophus monticola LR/lc
 Black duiker, Cephalophus Niger LR/nt
 Black-fronted duiker, Cephalophus nigrifrons LR/nt
 Ogilby's duiker, Cephalophus ogilbyi LR/nt
 Red-flanked duiker, Cephalophus rufilatus LR/cd
 Yellow-backed duiker, Cephalophus silvicultor LR/nt
Genus: Sylvicapra
 Common duiker, Sylvicapra grimmia LR/lc
Subfamily: Hippotraginae
Genus: Hippotragus
 Roan antelope, Hippotragus equinus LR/cd
Genus: Oryx
 Scimitar oryx, Oryx dammah EW
Subfamily: Reduncinae
Genus: Kobus
 Waterbuck, Kobus ellipsiprymnus LR/cd
 Kob, Kobus kob LR/cd
Genus: Redunca
 Mountain reedbuck, Redunca fulvorufula LC
 Bohor reedbuck, Redunca redunca LR/cd

See also
List of chordate orders
Lists of mammals by region
List of prehistoric mammals
Mammal classification
List of mammals described in the 2000s

References

External links

Nigeria
Nigeria
Mammals